Vladimer Bochorishvili Stadium is a multi-use stadium in Tkibuli, Imereti region,  Georgia.  It is used mostly for football matches and is the home stadium of FC Meshakhte Tkibuli. The stadium is able to hold 6,000 people.

See also 
FC Meshakhte Tkibuli
 Stadiums in Georgia

References

Sports venues in Georgia (country)
Football venues in Georgia (country)
Buildings and structures in Imereti